The Gwere people, or Bagwere, are a Bantu ethnic group in Uganda. They are among the 65 ethnic societies of Uganda. Gwere is the root word, and the people are referred to as Bagwere (endonym) or Mugwere (singular).

Location

The Bagwere occupy an area of 2,388.3 km in eastern Uganda, mostly in Budaka District, Pallisa District and Kibuku District, Butebo District, where they make up over 80% of the population. They have the Bagisu, the Basoga, the Balamogi and the Iteso, the Banyole and the Jopadhola (Badama) as their neighbors. The city of Mbale is home to some Bagwere. Bagwere are also found in the following towns in Eastern Uganda: Pallisa, Budaka, Kibuku, Kagumu, Kamonkoli, Kadama, Kabweri, Iki-Iki, Bulangira, Kaderuna, Tirinyi, Butebo and Kakoro.

The Bagwere are said to have emigrated to their present area from Bunyoro and Toro, and travelled along Lake Kyoga, crossing River Mpologoma. For this reason all the tribes that settled along the shores Kyoga like; Baluli, Bakenye, Balamogi have a similar language to Lugwere. Their initial area of settlement has shrunk considerably as the Iteso and the Bagisu have pushed the Bagwere's frontiers inwards.

The language of the Bagwere is Lugwere

Cultural structure
The Bagwere are one of the 65 indigenous communities in Uganda according to the Third Schedule of Uganda´s Constitution (Uganda´s indigenous communities as at 1st February, 1926).

The Bagwere have many clans originating from different tribes including the following:

•Mubbala Kinyu Samuku Balamu Balalaka-Bengoma Clan
•Tazenya Henry Kamu Bakomolo-Nkobyokobyo Clan
•Kiore George William Bangwere Clan
•Kagino Obadia Bakaligwoko-Banamei Clan
•Tawonia Wilson Bapalama Clan
•Maiso Jonathan Kwiri Badeuke Clan
•Mulaiguli J. Samson Bakatikoko-Katikati Clan
•Mutono Eriamu Balunde Clan
•Wanzige Abel Balocho Clan
•Namoni Nathan Balalaka-Bakomba Clan
•Kirya Badru Babulanga Clan
•Gabbengere Christopher Balemeri (Nkembo)     Clan
•Mwereza Gastavas Bakabweri Clan
•Kirya Geoffrey Bakaligwoko-Bakituti Clan
•Wagombolya Amos Banyekero Clan
•Gwaku Yeku Esau Badaka Clan
•Padere K. Claudius Basobya Clan
•Kaali Akabu Bagolya Clan
•Mongosi Yokolamu Basikwe Clan
•Kanku Francis Bakaligwoko-Bagolo Clan
•Wasugirya Fred Bob Baikomba Clan
•Kabala Malijani Baganza Clan
•Dr. Kiryapawo Tomasi Baloki Clan
•Mwanika Kirizanto Banghole Clan
•Muwandiki Jamada Balumba Clan
•Bulolo Patrick Bakawolya Clan
•Kamusaiza Stephen Balalaka-Bayumbu Clan
•Waletelerya Abudu Badoba Clan
•Mbulambago James Bagema Clan
•Nabbola Abimereki Badukulo Clan
•Mbulakyalo Alozio Balabya Clan
•Tazenya Tomasi Bakatikoko-Bakidi Clan
•Muluga John Bosco Baigembe Clan
•Musayenka Dominic Bakyesa Clan
•Okou Danieri Bakamugewo Clan
•Guloba Peter Balefe Clan
•Abenga Kamya Abed Bakomolo-Bombo Clan
•Hajji Nfunyeku Jafali Balemeri Clan
•Kirya Felix William Banongo Clan
•Talyankona Yokosani Bawunga Clan
•Mukonge Issa Babeera Clan
•Seebe Twaha Bakyabulya Clan
•Nduga Wilson Banaminto Clan
•Kapisa Michael Bakaligwoko-Barweta Clan
•Hajji Nabwali Saibu Bafukanyi Clan
•Sisye Joram Bakalaga Clan
•Gantwase Efulaimu Baluba Clan
•Kadugala Isaa Balalaka-Bakidi Clan
•Wabwire Lala James Balala Clan
•Gole Nicholas Banamwera Clan
•Kisense Samuel Bansaka Clan
•Ochola Ben Baibere Clan
•Wadugu George Baseta Clan
•Taaya Peter Bagamole Clan
•Mugoda Ahamada Banyolo Clan
•Mivule Nimrod Balinda Clan
•Sajjabi S. Sulaiman Abengo Clan
•Wulira Abudalla Batego Clan
•Kasinyire Peter Bamango Clan
•Keni Bulasio Basobya Clan
•Mbulakyalo Geresom Baumo Clan
•Mugoya Samuel Bakoolia Clan
•Ntawo Boniface Balomi Clan
•Nakibbe Peter Bagoye Clan
•Onyait Zerubaberi Bakatikoko-Izima Clan
•Mujere Hamuzata Bakambe Clan
•Okurut Nikanoli Balalaka-Abanyana Clan
•Nabesya Jafali Banswenza Clan
•Tudde Abuneri Bakinomo Clan
•Napoma Christopher Bamesula Clan
•Onepuru Amuza Bangokho Clan
•Bonyo Talikula Stephen Bakaduka Clan
•Mukidi Moses Banyulya Clan
•Wakamba Samwiri Bakone Clan
•Wampula Rovers Bakaligwoko-Bayesi Clan
•Mudenya Sowali Baerya Clan
•Kitebe Twaha Boluko Clan
•Ochomo Michael Bakaligwoko-Baseta Clan
•Kamiza Abudu Basuswa-Abampiti Clan
•Yusufu Sadi Baisanga Clan
•Kidimu Bruhan Batenga Clan
•Igandi Ben Balemo Clan
•Mbulakyalo Alozio Balabya Clan
•Wenge Anthony Bayangu Clan

All clans of Bagwere are headed by a clan leader or the chief and one of the clan leaders is elected to be the "IKUMBANIA" and 86 Clans leaders of Bugwere subscribed to the Constitution of the "OBWA IKUMBAANIA BWA BUGWERE" of 14 November 2009 and elected the first chief cultural leader of the Bagwere His Highness KINTU SAMUKU BALAMU.

Intermarriage among members of the same clan is prohibited, as is the custom in most Bantu cultures.

Education
The Bagwere are few in number but many are very well educated. Over fifty of them hold either PhD's or master's degrees, degrees and diplomas from world-class reputable universities and other universities and institutions. Some notable Bagwere personalities over the years include:

 Kirya Balaki Kebba, Minister of State (for Security) Office of the President, NRC Member, Elected Member of Parliament 1962; Appointed Minister without portfolio; Minister of Works 1963; Minister of Mineral and Water. 
 George Kirya, chairman, Uganda Health Services Commission, former vice chancellor of Makerere University, and former High Commissioner to the United Kingdom
 William Mukama, teacher and politician
 Jennifer Namuyangu, former State Minister for Water Resources (2006–2011) & former MP for Pallisa District Women's Representative (2001–2011)
 Jeremiah Twatwa - Physician & politician, the elected Member of Parliament for "Iki-Iki County", Budaka District (2011–2016)
Mulabbi Elliot - Engineer and politician, former district engineer Pallisa and Budaka districts, commissioner MoW eastern region.

Economic activities
The main economic activity of the Bagwere is subsistence crop agriculture and animal husbandry. To a lesser extent, fishing, fish farming and bee keeping are increasingly practiced in Pallisa District. The major crops include:

 Cassava
 Millet
 Sorghum
 Maize
 Groundnuts
 Beans
 Peas
 Sweet potatoes
 Rice
 Cotton
 Sunflower
 Soybeans
 Bananas
 Matooke

Cattle, goats, sheep, poultry, pigs, are some of the animals raised in the district. The district is further blessed with nine (9) minor lakes that comprise part of the Lake Kyoga system. The following are the nine lakes:

 Lake Lemwa
 Lake Kawi
 Lake Nakwa
 Lake Meito
 Lake Geme
 Lake Omunuo
 Lake Nyanzala
 Lake Nyaguo

There are nine (9) stocked fish farms in the district. Fish farming offers a big potential to increase the supply of fish for the population and hence improve on the nutrition of the population. Fish species include:

 Carp
 Oreochromis niloticus
 Clarias spp.

See also
 Pallisa District
 Pallisa

References

External links
The Culture of the Bagwere

The Luapula Peoples of Northern Rhodesia: Custom and History in ...
 https://books.google.com/books?id=eXi7AAAAIAAJ
Ian George Cunnison - 1959 - Bwili
The Leopard and Goat clans are paired because leopards eat goats. ... personal prefix as in MuShimba, BaShimba, a Leopard clansman, and Leopard Clan.

Ethnic groups in Uganda